Servaea vestita is a species of jumping spider from Australia. It is found in Queensland, New South Wales and Tasmania.

Taxonomy
The species was first described by Ludwig Koch in 1879, as Scaea vestita. However, the genus name Scaea had already been used, so in 1888, Eugène Simon published the replacement name Servaea, and the species became Servaea vestita. In 2012, Richardson and Gunter synonymized the species with Servaea incana. This was rejected by Jerzy Prószyński in 2017, a view accepted by the World Spider Catalog .

References

External links

 Diagnostic drawings of S. vestita

Salticidae
Endemic fauna of Australia
Spiders of Australia
Spiders described in 1879